The Department of Industry, Science and Resources (DISR) is an Australian government department from 1 July 2022.  Formerly known as Department of Industry, Science, Energy and Resources (DISER), the Climate Change and Energy responsibility was transferred to Department of Climate Change, Energy, the Environment and Water.  DISR also takes functions that was previously under the Department of Prime Minister and Cabinet. 

The Chief Scientist for Australia has reported to the Minister for Science of the day since 1989.

The current head of the department is the Secretary, Meghan Quinn.

Scope
As outlined in the Administrative Arrangements Orders, the department is responsible for a wide range of functions including:
 Manufacturing and commerce including industry and market development
 Industry innovation policy and technology diffusion
 Industrial research and development, and commercialisation
 Biotechnology, excluding gene technology regulation
 Marketing of manufactures and services
 Enterprise improvement
 Construction industry, excluding workplace relations
 Business entry point management and business services coordination
 Provision of B2G and G2G authentication services
 Facilitation of the development of service industries generally
 Trade marks, plant breeders’ rights and patents of inventions and designs
 Country of origin labelling
 Anti-dumping
 Weights and measures standards
 Civil space issues
 Analytical laboratory services
 Science policy
 Science engagement and awareness
 Collaborative research in science and technology
 Co-ordination of science research policy
 Commercialisation and utilisation of public sector research
 Information and communications technology industry development
 Mineral and energy resources, including oil and gas, extraction and upstream processing
 Administration of export controls on rough diamonds, uranium and thorium
 Minerals and energy resources research, science and technology
 Geoscience research and information services including geodesy, mapping, remote sensing, groundwater and spatial data co-ordination
 Radioactive waste management
 International science engagement
 National policy issues relating to the digital economy
 Major projects facilitation

Structure
The Department was an Australian Public Service department, staffed by officials who were responsible to the Minister.

See also

 Department of Industry, Science and Resources (1998–2001)
 List of Australian Commonwealth Government entities

References

2022 establishments in Australia
Australia, Department of Industry, Science and Resources
Department of Industry, Science and Resources